Adrian Mannarino, who was the defending champion, chose to not compete this year.
Jarkko Nieminen won in the final match 4–6, 6–1, 7–5, against Stéphane Robert.

Seeds

Draw

Finals

Top half

Bottom half

References
 Main Draw
 Qualifying Draw

Caversham International Tennis Tournament - Singles